Suhrob Khodjaev (born 21 May 1993) is an Uzbek hammer thrower. He was born in and originally competed for Tajikistan.

Khodjaev competed for Uzbekistan at the 2012 Summer Olympics. He won a bronze medal in hammer throw at the 2012 World Junior Championships in Athletics.

Competition record

References

External links

1993 births
Living people
Uzbekistani male hammer throwers
Tajikistani male hammer throwers
Olympic athletes of Uzbekistan
Athletes (track and field) at the 2012 Summer Olympics
Athletes (track and field) at the 2016 Summer Olympics
Athletes (track and field) at the 2014 Asian Games
Athletes (track and field) at the 2018 Asian Games
World Athletics Championships athletes for Uzbekistan
Asian Games medalists in athletics (track and field)
Asian Games bronze medalists for Uzbekistan
Medalists at the 2018 Asian Games
Athletes (track and field) at the 2020 Summer Olympics
21st-century Uzbekistani people
21st-century Tajikistani people